Hounded may refer to:

 Hounded (film), a 2001 Disney Channel Original Movie
 Hounded (TV series), a CBBC sitcom
 "Hounded" (The Walking Dead), an episode of the television series The Walking Dead
 Hounded (novel), a novel by Kevin Hearne